Mostafa Hosseinkhani (born 27 March 1989) is an Iranian freestyle wrestler. He won gold medals at the 2014 and 2016 Asian championships and bronze medals at the 2016 world and 2018 Asian championships.

Hosseinkhani took up wrestling in 2000. He injured his left arm in April 2016 and failed to qualify for the 2016 Olympics. He competed in the men's 74 kg event at the 2020 Summer Olympics in Tokyo, Japan.

References

External links 
 Mostafa Hosseinkhani on instagram

External links
 

 Mostafa hosseinkhani on instagram

Living people
Sportspeople from Tehran
Iranian male sport wrestlers
Wrestlers at the 2014 Asian Games
World Wrestling Championships medalists
1989 births
Wrestlers at the 2018 Asian Games
Asian Games competitors for Iran
Asian Wrestling Championships medalists
Islamic Solidarity Games medalists in wrestling
Wrestlers at the 2020 Summer Olympics
Olympic wrestlers of Iran
20th-century Iranian people
21st-century Iranian people
Islamic Solidarity Games competitors for Iran